Bad Ditzenbach (Swabian: Ditzebach) is a municipality in the district of Göppingen in Baden-Württemberg in southern Germany.

History
They were awarded to the Kingdom of Württemberg, a state that had come to control most of the surrounding territory between 1422 and 1455. The nearby village of Auendorf had already mostly been a possession of Württemberg before mediatization. Auendorf and Gosbach were assigned to  until transfer in 1808 to Oberamt Wiesensteig. The three townships were placed in the district of Göppingen in 1938. The three townships were merged into a new municipality, Bad Ditzenbach, on 1 January 1975.

Bad Ditzenbach
In 1560, a spa was built in the town on its mineral springs. It received the name Bad, "Spa", from the Weimar Republic in 1929.

Geography
The municipality (Gemeinde) of Bad Ditzenbach is situated in the district of Göppingen, of the German state of Baden-Württemberg. Bad Ditzenbach lies along Göppingen's district border with the Alb-Danube district to the south. Elevation above sea level in the municipality ranges from a high of  Normalnull (NN) to a low of  NN along the Fils.

A portion of the Federally-protected  is located in Bad Ditzenbach's municipal area.

Politics
Bad Ditzenbach has three boroughs (Ortsteile): Auendorf, Bad Ditzenbach, and Gosbach. The municipality is in a municipal association (Verwaltungsgemeinschaft) with the neighboring municipality of Deggingen. Two abandoned villages, Hiltenburg and Leimberg, are found in Bad Ditzenbach's municipal area.

Coat of arms
The municipal coat of arms for Bad Ditzenbach displays a golden fountain with silver waters in front of a green, three-pointed hill that almost totally covers the field, also gold. The fountain is taken from the coat of arms of the town of Bad Ditzenbach, and the hill is a reference to the local terrain. The municipal coat of arms was approved by the Göppingen district office on 17 August 1977 and a corresponding flag issued.

Transportation
Bad Ditzenbach is connected to Germany's network of roadways by Bundesautobahn 8, specifically its junction at Mühlhausen im Täle. From 1903 to 1968, the municipality was connected to Germany's railway to the Tälesbahn railroad.

Notes

External links

  (in German)

Göppingen (district)
Spa towns in Germany